Operation Black Arrow  ( Mivtza Ḥetz Shaḥor) was an Israeli military operation carried out in Gaza (while under Egyptian control) on 28 February 1955. The operation targeted the Egyptian Army. Thirty-eight Egyptian soldiers were killed during the operation as were eight Israelis.

Israel's actions were unanimously condemned by United Nations Security Council Resolution 106.

Background
The 1948 Arab–Israeli War resulted in a decisive Israeli victory. However, the Arab nations remained intransigent and were only willing to sign armistice agreements with Israel. Thus, a static situation of “no war, no peace,” emerged. Moreover, hundreds of thousands of Arab refugees now camped alongside Israel's porous borders. The refugees lived in squalor and were kept under martial law. Arab governments, but in particular Egypt, sensing the refugees’ discontent, capitalized on the opportunity to recruit embittered Palestinians for armed actions against Israel. At first, the infiltrations and border transgressions took the form of petty banditry and thievery. However, by 1954, Egyptian military intelligence was taking an active role in providing various forms of support for Palestinian fedayeen activity. After an attack by the fedayeen, Israel decided to take decisive action against Egypt for its sponsorship of the Palestinians and initiated Operation Black Arrow.

Casus belli
On February 25, 1955, Arab infiltrators murdered an Israeli civilian in the town of Rehovot. One of the militants who was pursued and killed by Israeli forces was found to be in possession of documents linking him to Egyptian military intelligence. Defense Minister David Ben-Gurion and Chief of Staff Moshe Dayan demanded a harsh response directed against those believed to have sponsored the atrocity. Prime Minister Moshe Sharett was more hesitant but demurred.

Attack
On February 28, Ariel Sharon, commander of the Paratroop Brigade was issued the go-ahead to initiate Operation Black Arrow. That night, a force of 150 paratroops, led by Aharon Davidi and Danny Matt attacked an Egyptian base near the city of Gaza. An Egyptian military relief convoy was ambushed en route. In total, either thirty-seven or thirty-eight Egyptian soldiers were killed and many more injured for the loss of eight Israelis.

Aftermath
In Egypt there was a sense of humiliation. Not since the Arab–Israeli war of 1948 had the Egyptians suffered such a blow. The Israeli attack was unanimously condemned by the United Nations Security Council. In response President Nasser decided to close the Gulf of Aqaba to Israeli shipping and air traffic. He also increased support for Palestinian fedayeen raids, which invited even harsher Israeli retaliatory raids such as Operation Elkayam (72 Egyptian KIA) and Operation Volcano (81 Egyptian KIA, 55 captured). Tensions between Egypt and Israel ultimately led to Israel taking part in the invasion of the Sinai Peninsula and Suez Canal alongside the United Kingdom and France (who held different motivations for invading) in which the Egyptians were defeated and the Fedayeen bases disbanded.

Memorial
A memorial  to this operation and other IDF paratrooper operations is situated between kibbutz Mefalsim and the Gaza strip. As many as 5 Bible verses are cited at different corners of the memorial

References

External links
Operation Black Arrow,Exhibition in the IDF&Defense establishment archives

Counterterrorism
Israel Defense Forces
Special forces of Israel
Reprisal operations (Israel)
Ariel Sharon
Conflicts in 1955
1955 in Israel
1955 in Egypt
History of Gaza City